Fraserburgh Hospital is a community hospital in Lochpots Road, Fraserburgh, Scotland. It is managed by NHS Grampian.

History
The facility was established as an infectious diseases hospital in 1905.

It joined the National Health Service in 1948. The old infectious diseases hospital was demolished in order to make way for a modern facility which was also intended to replace the old Thomas Walker Hospital in Charlotte Street which had opened in 1878. The new facility was designed by Moira & Moira and opened on the site by Sidney G. Davidson FRCS  in September 1968. The Princess Royal visited the site to celebrate the hospital's 50th anniversary on 27 September 2018.

References

NHS Scotland hospitals
Hospital buildings completed in 1968
1905 establishments in Scotland
Hospitals established in 1905
Hospitals in Aberdeenshire